Blue Glacier  is a large glacier which flows into Bowers Piedmont Glacier about  south of New Harbour, in Victoria Land, Antarctica. Robbins Hill is the East-most rock unit on the north side of the terminus of the glacier.

It was discovered by the British National Antarctic Expedition under Robert Falcon Scott, 1901–04, who gave it this name because of its clear blue ice at the time of discovery.

References

 

Glaciers of Scott Coast